María de los Ángeles Loya Sáenz (born 1 October 1944), known by her stage name La Consentida, is a Mexican singer and actress. She is one of the last surviving stars from the Golden Age of Mexican cinema.

Born in Parral, Chihuahua, she began her career in 1953 when she recorded her first hit single, "Gorrioncillo pecho amarillo". She recorded exclusively for RCA Víctor, and her recordings featured accompaniment by the Mariachi Vargas de Tecalitlán.

She made her film debut as a musical guest in the comedy El hombre inquieto (1954), starring Germán Valdés and Joaquín Pardavé. She acted in Lupe Balazos, starring Lucha Moreno and Julio Aldama.

Discography

Studio albums 
 La Consentida, vol. 1
 La Consentida, vol. 2

References

External links 
 

Ranchera singers
1944 births
Living people
Singers from Chihuahua (state)
20th-century Mexican women singers
21st-century Mexican women singers